Huechuraba is a city and commune of Chile located in Santiago Province, Santiago Metropolitan Region.

Demographics
The population grew by 19.9% (12,286 persons) between the 1992 and 2002 censuses. The projected 2006 population was 82,200 (2006 projection)

Stats
Average annual household income: $52,904 (PPP, 2006)
Population below poverty line: 14.5% (2006)
Regional quality of life index: 73.23, medium, 31 out of 52 (2005)
Human Development Index: 0.737, 56 out of 341 (2003)

Administration
The Municipality of Huechuraba is directed in the period 2021-2024 by the Mayor Carlos Cuadrado Prats (PPD), who is advised by the councilors:
 Barbara Plaza Escobar (IND-PC)
 Elizabeth Roco Campos (IND-RD)
 Karina Soto Rodríguez (IND)
 Leonardo Igor Bustamante (PS)
 Carolina Rojas Charcas (PPD)
 María Elisa Kaelin Tello (IND-PPD)
 Ignacio Silva Santa Cruz (PDC)
 Fernando Pérez Navarro (RN)

Within the electoral divisions of Chile, Huechuraba is represented in the Chamber of Deputies by Érika Olivera (RN), Jorge Durán Espinoza (RN), José Carlos Meza (REP), Andrés Giordano Salazar (IL), Karol Cariola (PC), Boris Marrera (PC) and Maite Orsini (RD), as part of the 9th electoral district, (together with Conchalí,Quinta Normal, Independencia, Recoleta, Lo Prado, Cerro Navia and Renca).

References

External links
  Municipality of Huechuraba

Populated places in Santiago Province, Chile
Geography of Santiago, Chile
Communes of Chile
1946 establishments in Chile